Christopher Augustus Bergen (August 2, 1841 – February 18, 1905) was an American Republican Party politician who represented New Jersey's 1st congressional district in the United States House of Representatives for two terms from 1889 to 1893.

Early life and education
Born in Bridge Point, New Jersey, Bergen attended Harlingen School and Edge Hill Classical School and was graduated from Princeton College, where he studied law, in 1863.  He was licensed by the supreme court of New Jersey in 1866 as an attorney and commenced practice in Camden, New Jersey.

Congress
Bergen was elected as a Republican to the 51st and 52nd Congresses, holding office from March 4, 1889 to March 3, 1893.  He was an unsuccessful candidate for renomination in 1892, after which he resumed the practice of law.

Later life
In 1903, Bergen moved to Haverford, Pennsylvania, where he died on February 18, 1905.  He was interred in Evergreen Cemetery, Camden, New Jersey.

His son, Martin V. Bergen, was also a lawyer, played football and baseball at Princeton University, and coached football at Princeton, Grinnell College, and the University of Virginia.

References

External links

Christopher Augustus Bergen at The Political Graveyard

1841 births
1905 deaths
19th-century American politicians
New Jersey lawyers
Pennsylvania Republicans
Princeton University alumni
Republican Party members of the United States House of Representatives from New Jersey
Burials in New Jersey